is a Japanese international rugby union player who plays in the scrum-half position.

Early and provincial career
Shigeno was born in Osaka Prefecture but attended university in Tokyo after which he joined the NEC Green Rockets ahead of the 2013–14 Top League season. In 2015, he spent a year in New Zealand playing for Ponsonby in the local Auckland league after which he earned selection for 's squad for the 2015 ITM Cup where he made 6 appearances.

Super Rugby career
Shigeno was selected as a member of the first ever Sunwolves squad ahead of the 2016 Super Rugby season.   He played 11 matches in their debut campaign and scored 1 try.

International
Shigeno earned his first cap for Japan in a match against  in Vancouver during the 2016 mid-year rugby union internationals and followed it up with 2 more appearances in Japan's home series against  which was played in Toyota and Tokyo.   His first try for his country came in his third appearance, a 21-16 defeat to Scotland.

Super Rugby statistics

References

1990 births
Living people
Japanese rugby union players
Japan international rugby union players
Rugby union scrum-halves
Green Rockets Tokatsu players
Auckland rugby union players
Sunwolves players
Ponsonby RFC players
Japanese expatriate rugby union players
Japanese expatriate sportspeople in New Zealand
Expatriate rugby union players in New Zealand
Toyota Verblitz players